Sir William Edward Stanley Forster (15 June 1921 – 31 January 1997) was the first Chief Justice of the Supreme Court of the Northern Territory holding that position from 1979 to 1985. Before that he was the first (and only) Chief Judge from 1977 to 1979 and Senior Judge from 1971 to 1977, all positions which were effectively the same.

Sir William was born in Sydney, New South Wales on 15 June 1921 and, after moving to Adelaide in 1929, attended St Peter's College, Adelaide.

Early legal life
Forster graduated with a Bachelor of Laws from the University of Adelaide. He was in the Royal Australian Air Force from  1940 to 1946 and was a Magistrate at the Adelaide Police Court from 1959 to 1961. He was District Registrar of the High Court of Australia from 1966 to 1971 and before that was District Registrar from 1961 to 1966; and was Master of the Supreme Court of South Australia from 1966 to 1971 and Deputy Master from 1961 to 1966.

A member of the Standing Committee Senate at the Adelaide University from 1967 to 1971, Forster was lecturer of Law and Procedure at the same time and lecturer of Criminal Law from 1957 to 1958.

As Judge of the Northern Territory Supreme Court

He was appointed Senior Judge of the Supreme Court of the Northern Territory on 28 June 1971 and replaced Justice Blackburn who had taken up appointment with the Supreme Court of the Australian Capital Territory.

After Cyclone Tracy had destroyed Darwin in 1974, Justice Forster ensured the Supreme Court was fully functional by March 1975.

Chief Justice Forster was a Member of the Aboriginal Theatre Foundation from 1972 to 1975 and President of the Northern Territory Division of the Australian Red Cross from 1973 to 1985. He was also Chairman of the Museum and Galleries Board of the Northern Territory from 1974 to 1985.

Chief Justice Forster was Chairman of the Northern Territory Parole Board from 1976 to 1985 and held a Dormant Commission as Acting Administrator of the Northern Territory from 1976 to 1985. He was also a Justice of the Federal Court of Australia from 1977 to 1989.

Chief Justice Forster was a champion of the local legal profession and upon his retirement expressed a wish that vacancies on the Bench be filled by local practitioners.  Indeed, all appointments to the Supreme Court from 1991 (other than that of Chief Justice Brian Ross Martin in 2004) have been from the local profession.  
  
In 1976, Chief Justice Forster was responsible for the introduction of the 'Anunga Rules' which, established guidelines for the interrogation of Aboriginal and non-English-speaking persons by Police to ensure that admissions were voluntarily obtained.

He retired in 1985 due to ill-health and relocated to Perth.

Awards and honours
Justice Forster was awarded a Knight Bachelor in 1982 for services to law and is the only person to be knighted for services to the Northern Territory.

William Forster Chambers in Darwin now carries his name.

External links
NT Supreme Court profile of William Forster
History of the NT Supreme Court
Northern Territory Chronicle 1977
Photo of William Forster

Judges of the Federal Court of Australia
Chief Justices of the Northern Territory
Judges of the Supreme Court of the Northern Territory
People from Darwin, Northern Territory
People educated at St Peter's College, Adelaide
20th-century Australian judges
1921 births
1997 deaths
Judges of the Supreme Court of Christmas Island
Judges of the Supreme Court of the Cocos (Keeling) Islands